Jam Mir Kamal Khan Alyani (born 1 January 1970) (Sindhi: ڄام ڪمال خان آلياڻي)is a Pakistani politician who served as the 16th Chief Minister of Balochistan, between August 2018 and October 2021. He has been a member of the Provincial Assembly of Balochistan since August 2018.

Previously, he was a member of the National Assembly of Pakistan from June 2013 to May 2018 and served as Minister of State for Petroleum and Natural Resources in the cabinet of Prime Minister Nawaz Sharif from 2013 to 2017 and again from August 2017 to March 2018 in the cabinet of Prime Minister Shahid Khaqan Abbasi.

Personal life and education
He was born on 1 January 1970 into Sindhi family. Jam Mohammad Yousaf.
One of his ancestors, Jam Arradin Korejo, migrated from Sindh and settled in Kanrach during the reign of the Mughal emperor Jahangir (1569-1627). Later one of the descendants of Jam Arradin, Jam Rabdino was known for his bravery and generosity.

At that time Lasbela was under the rule of Burfats 
Finally Jams came over and they ruled over Lasbela for over three centuries and produced nine able rulers namely;
Jam Aali Korejo (1742–1760)
Jam Ghulam Shah Korejo (1760–1776)
Jam Mir Khan Korejo (1776–1830)
Jam Aali Khan II (1830–1858), Jam Mir Khan II (1858–1897), Jam Mir Khan III (1897–1921), Jam Kamal Khan I (1921–1945), Jam Ghulam Muhammad Khan (1945–1963) and Jam Ghulam Qadir Khan (1963–1988).

Jam Kamal holds a degree in marketing from Greenwich University, Karachi.

He is the current and 13th Jam of Lasbela. He belongs to the royal Jam family of Lasbela.

Political career

He twice served the District Nazim of the Lasbela District in 2001 and 2005 before he was elected to the National Assembly of Pakistan as an independent candidate from Constituency NA-270 (Awaran-cum-Lasbela) in the 2013 Pakistani general election. He received 56,658 votes and defeated Ghulam Akbar Lasi, a candidate of the Pakistan Peoples Party (PPP). In the same election, he ran for the seat of the Provincial Assembly of Balochistan from Constituency PB-45 (Lasbela-II) as an independent candidate but was unsuccessful. He received 20,169 votes and lost the seat to Mohammad Saleh Bhutani.

In June 2013, he was appointed as the Minister of State for Petroleum & Natural Resources in the Cabinet of Prime Minister Nawaz Sharif. He had ceased to hold ministerial office in July 2017 when the federal cabinet was disbanded following the resignation of Prime Minister Nawaz Sharif after the Panama Papers case decision.

Following the election of Shahid Khaqan Abbasi as Prime Minister of Pakistan in August 2017, he was inducted into the federal cabinet of Abbasi. He was appointed as the Minister of State for Petroleum, a division under the then newly-created Ministry of Energy.

In April 2018, he resigned from the post of Minister of State for Petroleum. In April 2018, he quit PML-N and helped in creating the Balochistan Awami Party (BAP). In May 2018, he was elected as the first president of the BAP.

He resigned on 1 October 2021 as president of Balochistan Awami Party but later withdrew his decision.

Chief Minister

He was elected to the Provincial Assembly of Balochistan as a candidate of BAP from Constituency PB-50 (Lasbela-II) in the 2018 Pakistani general election. Following his successful election, BAP nominated him for the office of Chief Minister of Balochistan. On 18 August 2018, he was elected Chief Minister of Balochistan. He received 39 votes against his opponent Mir Younus Aziz Zehri who received 20 votes. The same day, he was sworn in as the 16th chief minister of Balochistan.

After assuming the office as the Chief Minister, Khan formed a 10-member cabinet. Of the 10-member cabinet sworn in on 27 August 2018, 9 were provincial ministers and 1 was an advisor. The second part of his cabinet, consisting of 2 provincial ministers was sworn in on 8 September 2018 increasing the size of the cabinet to 12. The same day, he appointed three advisors.
On 14 September 2021, opposition parties presented a motion of no confidence against him to the Secretary of the Balochistan Assembly.
On 20 October 2021 , a motion of no confidence was presented against him in the Provincial Assembly of Balochistan.
He resigned as Chief Minister of Balochistan on 24 October 2021.

References

Living people
1973 births
Pakistani MNAs 2013–2018
Balochistan MPAs 2018–2023
Pakistan Muslim League (N) MNAs
Balochistan Awami Party MPAs (Balochistan)
Jams of Lasbela
Jamote people
Chief Ministers of Balochistan, Pakistan
People from Lasbela District